Twilight is the second album by Filipino band Hale, released under EMI Philippines on September 30, 2006. It contains four singles, which are the widely nominated "Waltz", "Hide and Seek", "Shooting Star" and "The Ballad Of". It was certified Gold (15, 000 copies sold) in October 2006 simultaneous to the release of "Waltz" and just a week before its release.

The album consists of musical arrangements of a wider spectrum and very much reflects the band's massive success thanks to their certified Triple Platinum self-titled debut album, Hale.

Track listing

References

2006 albums
Hale (band) albums